Project Omega is a 1980 video game published by Adventure International for the TRS-80.

Contents
Project Omega is a game in which the player manages a space colony.

Reception
Jon Mishcon reviewed Project Omega in The Space Gamer No. 42. Mishcon commented that "A first rate game. I highly recommend it."

Reviews
Moves #57, p15

References

1980 video games
Adventure International games
TRS-80 games
TRS-80-only games
Video games developed in the United States